Odahuttidavaru (Kannada: ಒಡಹುಟ್ಟಿದವರು) is a 1969 Indian Kannada film, directed by B. N. Haridas and produced by B. S. Ranga. The film stars Kalyan Kumar, Udaykumar, Balakrishna and Dinesh in the lead roles. The film has musical score by S. Hanumantha Rao.

Cast

Kalyan Kumar
Udaykumar
Kalpana
Pandari Bai
Balakrishna
Dinesh
Rathnakar
Shyam
Mahadevaiah
Baby Shyamsundar
Jaya
Baby Maithili

References

External links
 

1969 films
1960s Kannada-language films